"Circles (Just My Good Time)" is a 2005 collaborative single by Australian production duo Busface and British singer-songwriter Sophie Ellis-Bextor, credited as Mademoiselle E.B on all releases of the single. It peaked at #1 on the Music Week Commercial Club Chart, and at #10 on the Australian ARIA Top 20 Dance Chart. However, the single flopped in major charts, peaking at #96 at the UK Top 75, and at #63 in Australia, becoming a commercial failure.

Track listing
 CD single
"Circles (Just My Good Time)" (Busface Radio Edit) 3:30
"Circles (Just My Good Time)" (EMP Mix) 7:11
"Circles (Just My Good Time)" (Busface 12") 6:44
"Circles (Just My Good Time)" (Spandex Mix) 4:40
"Circles (Just My Good Time)" (Spandex Dub) 4:38

 12" Vinyl
"Circles (Just My Good Time)" (Busface 12") 6:44
"Circles (Just My Good Time)" (Spandex Mix) 4:40
"Circles (Just My Good Time)" (EMP Mix) 7:11
"Circles (Just My Good Time)" (Spandex Dub) 4:38

Charts

References

Techno songs
2005 singles
Sophie Ellis-Bextor songs
Songs written by Sophie Ellis-Bextor
2004 songs